Bruce County is a county in Southwestern Ontario, Canada comprising eight lower-tier municipalities and with a 2016 population of 66,491. It is named for James Bruce, 8th Earl of Elgin and 12th Earl of Kincardine, sixth Governor General of the Province of Canada. The Bruce name is also linked to the Bruce Trail and the Bruce Peninsula. It has three distinct areas. The Peninsula is part of the Niagara Escarpment and is known for its views, rock formations, cliffs, and hiking trails. The Lakeshore includes nearly 100 km of fresh water and soft sandy beaches. Finally, the Interior Region has a strong history in farming.

History

Cessions of First Nations lands
The territory of the County arose from various surrenders of First Nations lands.

The bulk of the land arose from the Queen's Bush, as a result of the 1836 Saugeen Tract Agreement. This was followed by the cession of the Indian Strip in 1851, for a road between Owen Sound and Southampton that was never constructed. Friction between the Chippewas that arose out of this led to significant delay in later negotiations.

The Saugeen Surrenders of 1854, known as "Treaty 72", transferred the remainder of the Bruce Peninsula to the Crown, reserving the following lands:

Municipal history

Huron County was organized in the Huron District in 1845, and the District itself (which had been continued for judicial purposes) was abolished at the beginning of 1850. Legislation passed later in the same session of the Legislative Assembly of the Province of Canada provided instead for it to be reconstituted as the United Counties of Huron, Perth and Bruce, with the territory of the Bruce Peninsula (referred to as the "Indian Reserve") withdrawn and annexed to Waterloo County. Bruce County consisted of the following townships:

 Huron
 Kinloss
 Curloss
 Carrick
 Kincardine
 Greenock
 Brant
 Bruce
 Saugeen
 Elderslie
 Arran

The Indian Reserve (being that part not otherwise transferred to Grey County) was later withdrawn from Waterloo and transferred to Bruce in 1851. The County of Perth was given its own Provisional Municipal Council at that time, and was separated from the United Counties in 1853.

In 1849, the Huron District Council initially united the area of the county with the United Townships of Wawanosh and Ashfield as a single municipality, which lasted until 1851 when Wawanosh and Ashfield were withdrawn.  The area then became known as the "United Townships in the County of Bruce", which lasted until its division into municipalities in 1854.

The Bruce Peninsula was later surveyed into townships, starting with Amabel and Albemarle in 1855, Eastnor in 1862, Lindsay in 1870, and St. Edmunds in 1871.

The following villages and towns would be constituted over the years:

Formation of a separate county council (18571867)

A Provisional Municipal Council was established for Bruce County at the beginning of 1857, Walkerton was initially proclaimed as the county seat, in preference to Kincardine, but local opposition forced the proclamation to be deferred until each town and village had presented a case for its selection. A subsequent proclamation confirmed Walkerton's selection.

In 1863, the provisional council promoted a bill in the Legislative Assembly to divide the county into the counties of Bruce and Wallace, with Kincardine and Southampton once more proposed as the respective county towns, but it only went as far as second reading and did not proceed further.

The provisional council later asked for legislation to provide for a referendum as to whether Walkerton, Paisley, Kincardine or another place would be the most acceptable choice. The referendum was held in September 1864, and Paisley received a plurality of the votes. In early 1865, the provisional council asked for legislation to confirm the result, but changed its mind later in the year in favour of Walkerton. Confirming legislation was passed in 1866 to provide for the dissolution of the United Counties on January 1, 1867, with Huron and Bruce becoming separate counties for all purposes.

Indigenous lands
Two First Nations are included within the Bruce census division, but their lands are separate from the county administration:

Land disputes
There have been disputes relating to cottage owners leasing properties on First Nations lands in the County. At Hope Bay, the occupiers of 68 cottages saw their leases revoked in 2007, resulting in a lawsuit that was only settled in 2018, leading to the resulting demolition of the cottages. in the Saugeen and Chief's Point reserves, there are four blocks of land encompassing 1,200 cottages that had been subject to ten-year lease agreements, on which a new five-year agreement came into effect in May 2021.

Litigation is underway, in which the Saugeen Ojibway First Nation is claiming the following:

Compensation resulting from the Crown breaching its fiduciary trust to protect and preserve the territory of the Saugeen Ojibway Nation;
Aboriginal title over the water territory around the Bruce Peninsula, from the international boundary with the United States in Lake Huron across to Georgian Bay; and
A declaration that their harvesting (ie, hunting and fishing) rights within their traditional territory were not extinguished by Treaty 72 of 1854.

In July 2021, the Ontario Superior Court dismissed the first two claims, but upheld the third. It deferred the question of liability with respect to municipal defendants for a subsequent hearing. An appeal has been filed with respect to the dismissals. Settlements on municipal liability have since been reached with Bruce County and Saugeen Shores.

The Saugeen First Nation is pursuing separate litigation relating to the determination of the actual reserve boundary. Treaty 72 had originally provided for the following reservation of land:

A dispute has arisen because the original survey of Amabel Township appears to be at variance with the treaty's specifications, with the eastern limit being drawn at 8 miles from the western limit, instead of the 9½ stated. The matter had been partially resolved some years earlier, with certain lands running from Sauble Beach down to Southampton reverting to the reserve. However, another part of the public beach in Sauble Beach, approximately 2 km in length, is still in dispute. The matter has been in protracted litigation, with separate claims being filed in 1990 by the federal government and in 1995 by the First Nation. An attempted settlement, arising from mediation overseen by the former Supreme Court of Canada justice Ian Binnie, collapsed in 2014. The case hearing began in November 2021. In the meantime, some friction has occurred between the First Nation and local authorities over maintenance work being undertaken on the local dunes.

The southern portion of Sauble Beach, known as Sauble Park, is within the limits of the reserve. As of 2018, beach parking is no longer available there, in line with what is already the case at Wasaga Beach and Grand Bend.

Demographics

Municipalities

Bruce County comprises eight municipalities (in population order):

The County of Bruce is governed by a council consisting of a warden and mayors of the area municipalities. County council meetings are held in the Bruce County Administration building in Walkerton, Ontario.

Environment

Protected areas

National parks 
 Bruce Peninsula National Park
 Fathom Five National Marine Park

Provincial parks 
 Inverhuron Provincial Park
 MacGregor Point Provincial Park
 Sauble Falls Provincial Park
 Black Creek Provincial Park

Conservation areas 
Bruce County is home to a number of conservation areas with the jurisdiction of Saugeen Valley Conservation Authority and Grey Sauble Conservation Authority.

Endangered species

 Massasauga Rattlesnake
 Hungerford's crawling water beetle

See also 
 Municipalities of Bruce County 
 List of municipalities in Ontario
 Bruce County municipal elections, 2010
 Ontario municipal elections, 2010
 Bruce Peninsula
 List of counties and districts of Canada
 List of townships in Ontario
 List of secondary schools in Ontario#Bruce County

Notes

References

External links

 
Counties in Ontario
Southwestern Ontario